Claudino Castro (1926 – 2003) was a Brazilian water polo player. He competed in the men's tournament at the 1952 Summer Olympics.

References

1926 births
2003 deaths
Brazilian male water polo players
Olympic water polo players of Brazil
Water polo players at the 1952 Summer Olympics
Sportspeople from Goiânia